Paul Dolden (born January 23, 1956 in Ottawa, Canada), is an electroacoustic music composer, currently living in Montréal, Canada.

Paul Dolden began his career at age 16 as a professional electric guitarist, violinist, and cellist. Since age 29 he has won over twenty international awards for his music which is performed in both Europe and North America. His approach to audio technology is to use it as a platform to launch otherwise impossible musical performances, thereby making his computer behave like a virtual orchestra. His compositions are characterised by a maximalist aesthetic in which hundreds of digitally recorded instrumental and vocal performances are combined in multiple layers.

Dolden's early works employed a unified approach to timbral and harmonic variation, but under the influence of postmodernism, his concerns shifted to include the juxtaposition and superimposition of disparate musical styles. His Resonance Cycle of works (1992–96) are an example of this. In his Twilight Cycle Dolden investigated contemporary new music-melody and dance rhythms, genres not normally associated with electroacoustic music.

Dolden’s 2-CD set, “L’Ivresse de la Vitesse” (empreintes DIGITALes) is regarded as a landmark recording and was selected by The Wire magazine as “one of the top 100 recordings of the 20th century.”

List of works
 The Melting Voice Through Mazes Running (1984)
 Veils (1984–85)
 In the Natural Doorway I Crouch (1986–87)
 Caught in an Octagon of Unaccustomed Light (1987–88)
 Measured Opalescence (1988), piano, percussion, and tape
 Below the Walls of Jericho (1988–89)
 Dancing on the Walls of Jericho (1990)
 Physics of Seduction. Invocation #1 (1991), electric guitar, and tape
 Physics of Seduction. Invocation #2 (1991), harpsichord, and tape
 Beyond the Walls of Jericho (1991–92)
 Physics of Seduction. Invocation #3 (1992), cello, and tape
 L'ivresse de la vitesse (1992–93)
 In a Bed Where the Moon Was Sweating. Resonance #1 (1993), clarinet, and tape
 Revenge of the Repressed. Resonance #2 (1993), soprano sax, and tape
 The Gravity of Silence. Resonance #5 (1995), flute, and tape
 The Heart Tears itself Apart with the Power of its own Muscle. Resonance #3 (1995), 4 violins, 2 violas, 2 cellos, 2 doublebasses, and tape
 Gravity's Stillness. Resonance #6 (1996), violin (or viola), and tape
 The Vertigo of Ritualized Frenzy. Resonance #4 (1996), reed instrument and/or piano (or accordion), and tape
 The Frenzy of Banging on a Can (1997), piano, bass clarinet (B flat clarinet), electric guitar, vibraphone, cello, doublebass, and tape
 The Heart Tears for Saxes and Brass (1998), 4 saxes (soprano, alto, tenor, baritone), 4 trombones, 4 trumpets, and tape
 Resonant Twilight (1998), orchestra, and tape
 Twilight's Dance (2000)
 Entropic Twilights (1997–2002)
 Rave #1 (2005), trumpet, electric guitar, vibraphone, piano, acoustic or electric bass, and tape

Recordings
 The Threshold of Deafening Silence (Tronia, TRD 0190, 1990)
 L'ivresse de la vitesse (empreintes DIGITALes, IMED 9917/18, 1994, 1999)
 Twilight's Dance (Immersion, Starkland 2010, 2000) (5-channel DVD-Video)
 Seuil de silences (empreintes DIGITALes, IMED 0369, 2003)
 L'ivresse de la vitesse 1 (empreintes DIGITALes, IMED 0317, 2003)
 L'ivresse de la vitesse 2 (empreintes DIGITALes, IMED 0318, 2003)
 Délires de plaisirs (empreintes DIGITALes, IMED 0577, 2005)
 Who Has the Biggest Sound? (Starkland ST-220, 2014)

References
Notes on Dolden's The Threshold of Deafening Silence, accessed 9 February 2010
Somoloco review of L’ivresse de la vitesse 1 (Empreintes DIGITALes IMED 0317), accessed 9 February 2010
The Wire's list of 100 Records That Set the World On Fire

External links
 Composer's website on  Electrocd, accessed 9 February 2010

Living people
Electroacoustic music composers
Canadian composers
Canadian male composers
1956 births